Yahya Al Ghassani (Arabic:يحيى الغساني) (born 18 April 1998)Emirati footballer. He currently plays as a winger for Shabab Al-Ahli.

Career
Yahya Al Ghassani is an Emirati football player born in the United Arab Emirates. He played with Al Ahli and Al Wahda in juniors. He renewed his 4-year contract with Al Wahda in 2018 to participate in the UAE Pro League. He was chosen to participate with the Olympic team to participate in 2020 AFC U-23 Championship. On 4 January 2021, left Al Wahda and signed with Shabab Al-Ahli for three years.

International career

Scores and results list the United Arab Emirates' goal tally first.

External links

References

1998 births
Emirati footballers
Olympic footballers of the United Arab Emirates
Naturalized citizens of the United Arab Emirates
Living people
Al Ahli Club (Dubai) players
Al Wahda FC players
Shabab Al-Ahli Club players
UAE Pro League players
Association football wingers
Place of birth missing (living people)